Balžis is a lake in the north-eastern part of Vilnius City Municipality, Lithuania. It is surrounded by Nemenčinė-Lavoriškės pine forests. Its coasts are quite high, dry. Balžis is connected to Lake Juodis and Lake Skarbelis by small rivulets. The lake belongs to the Neris River basin.

Lake Balžis is a popular recreation place for Vilnius inhabitants. In Soviet times, pioneer camp was located at the coast of the lake. Now Šilas city district is located around the lake.

The name of the lake balžis comes from the word balžas which means "serene, clear, bright".

Sources

Balzis